Lukáš Hodboď (born 2 March 1996 in Nymburk) is a Czech middle-distance runner specialising in the 800 metres. He reached the final at the 2018 European Championships finishing eighth. On 2019 Summer Universiade he won a bronze medal.

His personal bests in the event are 1:45.74 outdoors (Chorzów 2021) and 1:46.74 indoors (Ostrava 2022). Earlier in his career he competed in the 400 metres hurdles.

International competitions

References

1996 births
Living people
Czech male middle-distance runners
People from Nymburk
Universiade bronze medalists for the Czech Republic
Universiade medalists in athletics (track and field)
Medalists at the 2017 Summer Universiade
Medalists at the 2019 Summer Universiade
Sportspeople from the Central Bohemian Region